Ralph Wright (1908–1983) was an American animator.

Ralph Wright may also refer to:

Ralph Wright (American football) (1908–1976), American football player
Ralph Wright (footballer) (1947–2020), English footballer
Ralph G. Wright (born 1935), American politician